"Whole Lotta Holes" is a song written by Jon Vezner and Don Henry, and recorded by American country music artist Kathy Mattea.  It was released in July 1991 as the second single from the album Time Passes By.  The song reached #18 on the Billboard Hot Country Singles & Tracks chart.

Critical reception
The Roches provide background vocals.

Cash Box reviewer Kimmy Wix described the song favorably, saying that "another precious three minutes of Mattea's Time Passes By album, presents a whole lotta emotion and personal insight wrapped in a ballad that gets a little gutsy."

Chart performance

References

1991 singles
Kathy Mattea songs
Song recordings produced by Allen Reynolds
Mercury Records singles
1991 songs
Songs written by Jon Vezner
Songs written by Don Henry (musician)